A list of Australian Winter Olympians.

A

 Chris Allan: Cross-country skiing (1984)
 Mitchell Allan: Snowboard (2006)
 Jenny Altermatt: Alpine (1980)
 Bob Arnott: Alpine (1952)
 Tony Aslangal: Alpine (1956)

B

 Adam Barclay: Bobsleigh
 Aaron Bear: Alpine
 Dale Begg-Smith: Freestyle skier (moguls)
 Jason Begg-Smith: Freestyle (moguls) (2006)
 Manuela Berchtold: Freestyle (Moguls)
 Richard Biggins: Alpine (1988)
 Colleen Bolton: Cross-country skiing (1980)
 Tatiana Borodulina: Short track (2010)
 Esther Bottomley: Cross-country skiing (2006)
 Mervyn Bower: Figure skating (1956, 1960)
 Shaun Boyle: Skeleton (2006)
 Steven Bradbury: Short track
 Craig Branch: Alpine
 Jonathon Brauer: Alpine (2006)
 Rowena Bright: Alpine
 Torah Bright: Snowboard
 Peter Brockhoff: Alpine (1960, 1964)
 Tracy Brook: Figure skating (1988)
 Simon Brown: Alpine (1964)
 Clare-Louise Brumley: Cross-country skiing (2006)
 Sharon Burley: Figure skating (1976)
 Andrew Burton: Snowboard

C

 Elizabeth Cain: Figure skating (1980)
 Peter Cain: Figure skating (1980)
 Felicity Campbell: Short track (1992)
 Hannah Campbell-Pegg: Luge (2006)
 Alisa Camplin: Freestyle skier (aerials)
 Danielle Carr: Figure skating
 Stephen Carr: Figure skating
 Glenn Carroll: Bobsleigh (1994)
 Joanne Carter: Figure skating
 Bill Cherrell: Figure skating (1960)
 Rodney Clarke: Figure skating (1988)
 Nick Cleaver: Freestyle (moguls) (1992, 1994)
 Kim Clifford: Alpine (1976, 1980)
 Steven Clifford: Alpine (1972)
 Stephen Craig: Bobsleigh (1988)
 Colin Coates: Long track (1968, 1972, 1976, 1980, 1984, 1988)
 Jacqui Cooper: Freestyle (aerials)
 Adrian Costa: Freestyle (moguls)
 Paul Costa: Freestyle (moguls)
 Jacqui Cowderoy: Alpine (1980)
 Holly Crawford: Snowboard

D

 Janet Daly: Short track
 Christine Davy: Alpine (1956, 1960)
 Bill Day: Alpine (1952, 1956, 1960)
 Anthony Deane: Skeleton (2010)
 Maria Despas: Freestyle (moguls)
 Michael Dickson: Alpine
 Adrian DiPiazza: Bobsleigh (1988)
 Simon Dodd: Bobsleigh (1988)

E

 Anthony Evans: Cross-country skiing

F

 Nicholas Fisher: Freestyle (moguls) (2006)
 Judy Forras: Alpine (1964)
 Peter Forras: Alpine (1988)

G

 Allan Ganter: Figure skating (1956)
 Elizabeth Gardner: Freestyle (aerials) (2006)
 Karen Gardiner: Short track (1992)
 Jason Giobbi: Bobsleigh
 Richard Goerlitz: Short track speed skating
 Mark Gray: Cross-country skiing
 Paul Gray: Cross-country skiing
 David Griff: Alpine (1976)
 Alistair Guss: Alpine (1984)
 Antony Guss: Alpine (1980)
 Marilla Guss: Alpine (1984)
 Daniel Guerin Speed ski 1992

H

 Nancy Hallam: Figure skating (1952)
 Kieran Hansen: Short track (1992, 1994)
 Martin Harland: Bobsleigh (1988)
 Duncan Harvey: Bobsleigh (2010)
 Bruce Haslingden: Cross-country skiing (1952)
 Lachlan Hay: Short track (2006)
 Damon Hayler: Snowboard (2006)
 Chris Heberle: Cross-country skiing (1988)
 Joanne Henke: Alpine skiing (1976)
 Damon Hayler: Snowboard
 Colin Hickey: Long track (1952, 1956, 1960)
 Stephanie Hickey: Snowboard (2010)
 David Hislop: Cross-country skiing (1984, 1988)
 Melissa Hoar: Skeleton (2010)
 Vicki Holland: Figure skating (1984)
 Jarryd Hughes: Snowboard (2018)
 Anthony Huguet: Alpine (1994)
 Les Herstik  Speed ski 1992

I

 Lydia Ierodiaconou: Freestyle (aerials)

J
 Scott James: Snowboard (2010)
 Alice Jones: Alpine
 Andy Jung: Short track speed skating (2018)

K

 Danny Kah: Long track (1988, 1992, 1994)
 John Kah: Short track (1992)
 Karen Kah: Short track (1994)
 Charles Keeble: Figure skating (1956)
 Kenneth Kennedy: Long track (1936)
 Scott Kneller: Freestyle skiing (2010)
 Jeannette Korten: Alpine

L
 Cheltzie Lee: Figure skating (2010)
 Stephen Lee: Short track (2002, 2006)
 Steven Lee: Alpine (1984, 1988, 1992)
 Emma Lincoln-Smith: Skeleton (2010)
 Anthony Liu: Figure skating
 Astrid Loch-Wilkinson: Bobsleigh (2006)
 Jim Lynch: Long track (1972)

M

 Monica MacDonald: Figure skating (1988)
 Kirstie Marshall: Freestyle (aerials)
 Ross Martin: Cross-country skiing (1968)
 Bob Mongoloid: Freestyle (aerials) (1984)
 Jacqueline Mason: Figure skating (1956, 1960)
 Ben Mates: Snowboard (2006)
 Justin McDonald: Bobsleigh (1994)
 Frederick J McEvoy: Australian competitor for Britain in bobsleigh (1936)
 Alex McEwan: Short track speed skating
 Ondine McGlashan: Alpine (1984)
 Cecilia McIntosh: Bobsleigh (2010)
 Rob McIntyre: Alpine (1976, 1980)
 Shane McKenzie: Bobsleigh (2006)
 Andrew McNee: Short track speed skating
 Mark McNee: Short track speed skating
 Cameron Medhurst: Figure skating (1984, 1988, 1992)
 Malcolm Milne: Alpine (1968, 1972)
 Ross Milne: Died in training for 1964 Winter Olympics (alpine)
 Gweneth Molony: Figure skating (1952)
 Cameron Morton: Biathlon (2006)
 David Morris: Freestyle-aerials (2010)
 Sophie Muir: Short track (2010)
 Andrew Murtha: Short track (1992, 1994)
 Paul Murray: Cross-country skiing (2006, 2010)

N

 Paul Narracott: Bobsleigh (1992) (also competed in 1984 Summer Olympics)
 Hal Nerdal: Nordic combined (1960)
 Kathrin Nikolussi: Alpine
 Richard Nizielski: Short track (1992, 1994)

O

 Diane Ogle: Luge (1992)
 Emanuel Oppliger: Snowboard (2006)
 Jenny Owens: Alpine

P

 Sandra Paintin-Paul (also Sandra Paintin): Biathlon (1992, 1994)
 Barry Patten: Alpine (1952)
 Andrew Paul: Biathlon (1984, 1988)
 Trennon Paynter: Moguls
 Frank Prihoda: Alpine (1956)
 Ted Polgaze: Bobsleigh
 Duncan Pugh: Bobsleigh (2010)
 Alex Pullin: Snowboard(2010)

R

 Kylie Reed: Bobsleigh (2006)
 Michael Richmond: Long track (1980, 1984, 1988)
 Kerryn Rim (also Kerryn Pethybridge): Biathlon
 Michael Robertson: Freestyle (moguls) (2006)
 Sally Rodd: Alpine (1976)
 Jeremy Rolleston: Bobsleigh (2006, 2010)
 Emily Rosemond: Short track (2006)
 Anthony Ryan: Bobsleigh (2010)

S

 William Schober: Figure skating (1976)
 Jane Sexton: Moguls
 Aileen Shaw: Figure skating (1960)
 Johanna Shaw: Snowboard (2006)
 Elliott Shriane: Short track (2006)
 Ben Sim: Cross-country skiing (2010)
 Cedric Sloane: Cross-country skiing (1952)
 Christine Smith: Alpine (1964)
 Tim Spencer: Figure skating (1960)
 Christopher Spring: Bobsleigh (2010)
 Michelle Steele: Skeleton (2006)
 Zali Steggall: Alpine
 Zeke Steggall: Snowboard
 Angus Stuart: Bobsleigh (1988)
 Adrian Swan: Figure skating (1952)
 Jono Sweet: Freestyle (aerials)(1998)

T

 Phillip Tahmindjis: Long track (1988, 1992, 1994)
 Emily Thomas: Snowboard (2006)
 Glenn Turner: Bobsleigh (1992)
 Roy Tutty: Long track (1960)

W

 James Walker: Alpine (1956)
 Scott Walker: Bobsleigh
 Bradley Wall: Alpine
 Richard Walpole: Cross-country skiing
 Peter Wenzel: Alpine (1964)
 Roger White: Luge
 Mary Wilson: Figure skating (1960)

Z

 Stephanie Zhang: Figure skating

See also

 Australia at the Winter Olympics

Winter
Australia at the Winter Olympics